The following is a list of FCC-licensed radio stations in the U.S. state of Tennessee, which can be sorted by their call signs, frequencies, cities of license, licensees, and programming formats.

List of radio stations

Defunct
 W4XA
 WCLC
 WEMG, Knoxville
 WFWL
 WHER, Memphis
 WMRO
 WNTT
 WOCV
 WSM-FM (1941–1951)
 WTNW
 WUTS
 WUTZ
 WXOQ

See also
 Tennessee media
 List of newspapers in Tennessee
 List of television stations in Tennessee
 Media of cities in Tennessee: Chattanooga, Knoxville, Memphis, Murfreesboro, Nashville

References

Bibliography
  
  
 
 
  (About WDIA)

External links

  (Directory ceased in 2017)
 Tennessee Association of Broadcasters

Images

 
Tennessee
Radio